Robert Eames may refer to:
 Robin Eames (Robert Henry Alexander Eames), Anglican bishop and peer
 Robert Eames (miller), member of the Massachusetts House of Representatives